Žlebské Chvalovice is a municipality and village in Chrudim District in the Pardubice Region of the Czech Republic. It has about 100 inhabitants.

Administrative parts
The hamlet of Žlebská Lhotka is an administrative part of Žlebské Chvalovice.

Gallery

References

External links

Villages in Chrudim District